In Vedic timekeeping, a tithi is a "duration of two faces of moon that is observed from earth", known as milа̄lyа̄ in Nepal Bhasa, or the time it takes for the longitudinal angle between the Moon and the Sun to increase by 12°. In other words, a tithi is a time duration between the consecutive epochs that correspond to when the longitudinal angle between the Sun and the Moon is an integer multiple of 12°. Tithis begin at varying times of day and vary in duration approximately from 19 to 26 hours. Every day of a lunar month is called tithi.

Panchanga

A Hindu muhurta (forty-eight minute duration) can be represented in five attributes of Hindu astronomy namely, vara the weekday, tithi, nakshatra the Moon's asterism, yoga the angular relationship between Sun and Moon and karana half of tithi.

Tithi plays an important role along with nakshatra in Hindus' daily as well as special activities in selecting the muhurta.  There are auspicious tithis as well as inauspicious tithis, each considered more propitious for some purposes than for other.

There are 30 tithis in each lunar month, named as:

Types of Panchang 
The calculations in Panchang are also done according to time and place because the Panchang which is applicable in North India is not applicable in South India, hence the Panchangs differ according to the region. But in any Panchang, there is almost equality at the level of information. In any Panchang, there are five parts like Tithi, Vaar, Nakshatra, Yoga and Karan etc. Because the information of these five parts is contained in it, it is called Panchang. Talking about the types of Panchang, it is of many types depending on the region and religious-cultural basis.

Many types of almanacs are found in India alone. Indian almanacs are made mainly by calculating the time based on the motion of the moon, constellations and the sun. In North India, where the completion of the month is associated with Purnima, in South India Amavasya is considered as the end of the month. To calculate the year, it is calculated from the solar year. According to the constellations, a month is of 27 days, while according to the movement of the moon, it is considered to be of 29+1/2 days.

References

External links
 Ahargana - The Astronomy of the Hindu Calendar: Tithi Explains Tithi by means of astronomical simulations created using Stellarium.
 आज की तिथि क्या है, आज क्या तिथि है और आज की तिथि, आज का त्यौहार और व्रत
 Nepali Panchang
 Panchangam In Telugu With Tithi
 The Vaisnava Calendar
 The Hindu Lunisolar Calendar
 iPhone app for Nepali Panchang
 iPhone app
 Free Hindu Panchang
 Tithi in Indian Hindi Calendar

Hindu astronomy
Units of time
Hindi words and phrases
Hindu calendar
Articles containing video clips